In conformal geometry, the tractor bundle is a particular vector bundle constructed on a conformal manifold whose fibres form an effective representation of the conformal group  (see associated bundle).  

The term tractor is a portmanteau of "Tracy Thomas" and "twistor", the bundle having been introduced first by T. Y. Thomas as an alternative formulation of the Cartan conformal connection, and later rediscovered within the formalism of local twistors and generalized to projective connections by Michael Eastwood et al. in

References

Differential geometry
Conformal geometry
Vector bundles